Jani Iwamoto is a former Democratic member of the Utah Senate, representing the 4th District. Previously she served as a council member of the Salt Lake County Council.

Personal life, education, and career
Iwamoto was born and raised in Salt Lake County. She graduated from Highland High School and got a degree in mass communications from the University of Utah. She then obtained a legal degree from University of California at Davis. After graduation she practiced law as a partner and litigator in northern California. After living in California for several years she moved back to Utah. Once back in Utah she became more politically active. She first began working with the No! coalition, which sought to keep high level nuclear waste out of Utah. Later she was appointed by Governor Jon Huntsman, Jr. to serve on the Central Utah Water Conservancy District Board of Trustees, and the Court of Appeals Judicial Nominating Committee. Iwamoto is married and has two children, she currently resides in Holladay, Utah.

Political career
Iwamoto's first elected position was serving on the Salt Lake County Council as a councilmember. She served from 2009-2013. In 2014 she ran for the Utah State 4th district Senate seat, and won. Since 2014 she has been serving as the senator for this district. In 2018 she was elected Assistant Minority Whip by the Democrats in the Utah Senate.

In 2016, Senator Iwamoto served on the following committees in the legislature

 Executive Offices and Criminal Justice Appropriations Subcommittee
 Senate Ethics Committee
 Public Education Appropriations Subcommittee
 Senate Natural Resources, Agriculture, and Environment Committee
 Senate Economic Development and Workforce Services Committee

Electoral history

Legislation

2016 sponsored bills

Notable legislation
In 2016 Senator Iwamoto sponsored a bill that would have charged a dime for the use of plastic or paper bags. The bill did not pass, but Senator Iwamoto has said she will bring the bill back and attempt to pass it again during the 2017 legislative session.

References

External links
 Jani Iwamoto
 Jani Iwamoto Election Results
 Biography Project Vote Smart

Living people
Politicians from Salt Lake City
Democratic Party Utah state senators
University of Utah alumni
American politicians of Japanese descent
Asian-American people in Utah politics
American women of Japanese descent in politics
Women state legislators in Utah
University of California, Davis alumni
21st-century American politicians
21st-century American women politicians
Year of birth missing (living people)
People from Holladay, Utah